The Griman Creek Formation is a geological formation in northern New South Wales and southern Queensland, Australia whose strata date back to the Albian-Cenomanian of the Early-Late Cretaceous. It is most notable being a major source of opal, found near the town of Lightning Ridge, New South Wales. Alongside the opal opalised fossils are also found, including those of dinosaurs and primitive monotremes.

Description 
As a whole, the formation primarily consists of thinly bedded medium to fine sandstone, siltstone and mudstone, with sporadic coal seams. The contact between the two units is sudden and unconformable. Discontinuous clay lens beds within the Wallangulla Sandstone Member near Lightning Ridge, referred to as the Finch Clay Facies, are one of Australia's primary sources of commercial precious opal, with many mines dug in the area. These deposits are also the primary source of fossils within the formation, a large proportion of which are preserved as semi-precious opalized pseudomorphs. The fauna found in lightning ridge indicates that the depositonal environment of the Finch Clay Facies was in near-coastal freshwater lagoons.

Background

Fossil content 
Indeterminate avialan, euornithopod, and sauropod remains that were once misidentified as brachiosaurid are present in New South Wales, Australia. Euornithopod tracks are also present in New South Wales.

Dipnoi

Mammals

Crocodyliformes

Dinosaurs 
Indeterminate ornithopods and iguanodontians are known from the formation. Indeterminate avetheropods and megaraptorans are known from the formation. Two species of titanosauriforms and one species of titanosaur are known from teeth.

Pterosaurs

Testudines

See also 

 List of dinosaur-bearing rock formations
 South Polar region of the Cretaceous
 Western Interior Seaway
 Cenomanian-Turonian extinction event
 Cenomanian formations
Australia
 Winton Formation, fossiliferous formation in Queensland
 Molecap Greensand, fossiliferous formation in Western Australia
South America
 Alcântara Formation, fossiliferous formation of the São Luís-Grajaú Basin, Brazil
 Candeleros and Lisandro Formation, fossiliferous formations of the Neuquén Basin, Argentima
 Cerro Fortaleza and Mata Amarilla Formation, fossiliferous formations of the Austral Basin
 Chipaque Formation, Cenomanian-Turonian source rock formation of the Altiplano Cundiboyacense and Llanos Basin, Colombia
 Kem Kem Beds, Cenomanian Lagerstätte in Morocco
 Aoufous Formation
 Echkar Formation, fossiliferous formation of the Iullemmeden Basin, Niger
North America
 Cedar Mountain Formation
 Dakota Formation
Europe
 Cambridge Greensand, fossiliferous formation in England
Asia
 Burmese amber
 Sannine Formation
 Khodzhakul Formation, fossiliferous formation in Uzbekistan

References

Bibliography 

 
  
 
    
    
   

   
  

Geologic formations of Australia
Cretaceous System of Australia
Early Cretaceous Australia
Cenomanian Stage
Sandstone formations
Siltstone formations
Mudstone formations
Fluvial deposits
Ichnofossiliferous formations
Fossiliferous stratigraphic units of Oceania
Paleontology in New South Wales
Paleontology in Queensland
Geology of New South Wales
Geology of Queensland